Waterloo Road is the main road in the Waterloo district of London, England straddling the boroughs of Lambeth and Southwark. It runs between Westminster Bridge Road close to St George's Circus at the south-east end and Waterloo Bridge across the River Thames towards London's West End district at the north-west end.

At the northern end near the river are the Queen Elizabeth Hall and the Hayward Gallery to the west, the National Film Theatre below the road, and the Royal National Theatre to the east. In earlier times, this was the location of Cuper's Gardens.

Just to the south in the middle of a large roundabout with underground walkways is the British Film Institute (BFI) London IMAX Cinema. Nearby to the east is the James Clerk Maxwell Building of King's College London, named in honour of the physicist James Clerk Maxwell (1831–1879), who was a professor at the college from 1860.

A little further to the south is St John's Waterloo church, designed by Francis Octavius Bedford and built in 1824 to celebrate the victory of the Napoleonic Wars. The church was firebombed in 1940 and much of the interior was destroyed. It was restored and reopened in 1951, serving as the parish church for the Festival of Britain on the South Bank nearby.

Continuing south, to the west is Waterloo station. To the east is the Union Jack Club in Sandell Street and, further on, the well-known and historic Old Vic Theatre to the south of the corner with The Cut. Also located even further south in Waterloo Road on the west side is the headquarters of the London Ambulance Service.  On the opposite side is 157 Partnership House, former headquarters of USPG, CMS and other church mission/community-based organisations. Now boarded up and ready for redevelopment.

The road is designated as the A301, which continues across Waterloo Bridge.

Adjoining roads 
Baylis Road
The Cut
Stamford Street
Westminster Bridge Road
York Road
St George's Circus

References

External links 
Survey of London entry (1951)
Waterloo Quarter Business Alliance – official Business Improvement District website

Streets in the London Borough of Lambeth
Streets in the London Borough of Southwark